Emily Corrie (born 1978) is a British former sailor and actress. She is known in the United Kingdom for playing the character Suzanne 'Sooz' Lee in the Channel 4 drama As If and latterly in the American version of the same show.

Early life and education
The daughter of Tim Corrie, founder of United Agents and former Chairman of BAFTA, Emily Corrie was brought up in Chorleywood, Hertfordshire. After studying at the London Academy of Music and Dramatic Art, Corrie won her first screen role in 1999, playing Ray Winstone's daughter in the TV series Births, Marriages and Deaths.

Acting roles
She was the only actor from the British series of As If to star in the American version, moving to Los Angeles. McFly's debut number one single "5 Colours in Her Hair" was a homage to her character 'Sooz'.

Corrie also starred in the drama series NY-LON. In 2007 she had cameo roles in BBC One shows Casualty and Doctors.

In 2006, Emily played the role of WPC Harmison in the Touch of Frost episode entitled Endangered Species.

Royal Navy enlistment
Engaged to a Royal Navy sailor and a keen diver, in 2009 Corrie enlisted in the Royal Navy after becoming disillusioned with life as an actress. She completed her basic training at HMS Raleigh in Cornwall, where her passing out ceremony was held in October. Starting October 2009, she undertook another 10 months of training at both HMS Collingwood in Fareham, Hampshire and HMS Raleigh.

Dangerous driving conviction
In November 2015, Corrie was sentenced to twelve months in prison for dangerous driving, and four months for excessive alcohol consumption, following an incident in August of that year when she was apprehended on her way to her own hen party and found to be five times the legal alcohol limit. She was banned from driving for three years and ordered to take a retest.

References

External links

1978 births
Living people
People from Chorleywood
Alumni of the London Academy of Music and Dramatic Art
English television actresses
Royal Navy sailors
Actresses from Hertfordshire